Epigraphs is an album by Norwegian pianist Ketil Bjørnstad with American cellist David Darling recorded in 1998 and released on the ECM label in 2000. Tracks from this album were used as part of the soundtrack of Jean-Luc Godard's film In Praise of Love.

Reception 
The All About Jazz review by Glenn Astarita awarded the album 3.5 stars, and the Allmusic review by Rick Anderson awarded the album 4 stars, stating:

Track listing 
All compositions by Ketil Bjørnstad, except as indicated.
"Epigraph No. 1" – 3:04
"Upland" – 4:04
"Wakening" – 4:10
"Epigraph No. 1, Var. 1" – 1:39
"Pavane" – 3:39 (William Byrd)
"Fantasia" – 1:59 (Orlando Gibbons)
"Epigraph No. 1, Var. 2" – 2:20
"The Guest" – 2:41
"After Celan" – 3:46
"Song for TKJD" – 6:24 (David Darling)
"Silent Dream" – 4:41 (David Darling)
"The Lake" – 4:11
"Gothic" – 4:07
"Epigraph No. 1, Var. 3" – 1:28
"Le Jour S'Endort" – 3:44 (Guillaume Dufay)
"Factus Est Repente" – 4:54 (Gregor Aichinger)

Personnel 
Ketil Bjørnstad – piano
David Darling – cello

Notes 
Recorded at Rainbow Studio in Oslo, Norway in September 1998

References 

2000 albums
ECM Records albums
Ketil Bjørnstad albums
David Darling (musician) albums
Albums produced by Manfred Eicher